Huberta may refer to:

 Huberta (hippopotamus), South African hippopotamus
 260 Huberta, asteroid

See also
 Hubert, a name
 Hubert (disambiguation)